Nick Chou (born August 2, 1988) is a Taiwanese singer, rapper and actor. 

In 2010, Chou released his self-titled debut album. He then released his second album, S.N.G, in 2012, as well as appeared in his first drama series, I Love You So Much, as one of the male leads.

Life and career

Early life
Chou's family consists of his parents and himself. His mother, whose name is Billie  (比莉), starred in several dramas including They Kiss Again, Love Buffet, and The Rose, while his father, Chou Yuhou, worked with Vivian Hsu in Angel Heart.

Chou was born in Taipei, Taiwan on August 2, 1988. At the age of fifteen, he went to the United States to pursue his studies. He speaks English, Taiwanese Hokkien, and Mandarin Chinese fluently.

Pre-debut
When he was eight years old, Chou stood on the same stage with Michael Jackson on one of his concert tours held in 1996. At the age of fourteen, he sang the rap part and was featured on his mother's song, 「誰是白癡」 (Who is an idiot). At fifteen, he went to study in America and was spotted by an SM Entertainment representative. After hearing the news, his mother flew to America to accompany him in meeting with the company. At that time, he was almost recruited as one of the members to form Super Junior. However, since the contract terms included a 10-year-long deal, both he and his mother decided to decline the proposal. Later on, when asked if he had regretted passing up the opportunity, he said:

2008–2010: Debut
In 2009, Chou was featured in Jolin Tsai's music video, "Real Man", which gained him attention from the media. To prove his popularity, Warner Music set a condition that for him to release an album, he should attract at least 3000 fans to attend his debut concert. He won the chance to release an album after attracting 3085 fans to his concert held on July 10, 2010.

He finally released his debut album, Nick Chou (周湯豪), on July 16, 2010, under Warner Music Taiwan. The songs include "Chinese Heart (附心漢)", "Mad Love (愛瘋)", "Wake Up", and "Scolded Me Awake (罵醒我)". Chou also participated in the making of the album. In particular, he penned "Chinese Heart (附心漢)", and composed and arranged the songs "Wake Up", "Love Left (情剩)", and "翻頁作廢".

2011–present: S.N.G and I Love You So Much series
In 2012, Chou starred in CTS' drama series I Love You So Much as one of the main leads, Chang Shao Feng. The drama, which premiered on January 29, included Lan Cheng Long, Lee Chia-Ying, and Qiu Mao Di. Aside from acting in the drama, he also sang the ending song of the series entitled "Yi Wan Fen Zhi Yi De Ji Lu (億萬分之一的機率)".

Almost two years after the release of his debut album, Chou released his second album, S.N.G on May 30, 2012, under Gold Typhoon. Once again, Chou who planned to be a singer-songwriter, participated in the making of the album. He personally took on the composing, arranging and producing works of the entire album, which he spent a year writing. His record company organized a concert for him at Legacy venue on June 16 since the album had already sold 15000 copies in pre-order sales even before its release. In addition, Chou held a mini-concert the night before the album release to showcase some of his new songs. His title song, "S.N.G", which stands for "Super Nice Girl", was an R&B song about the search for a girlfriend. Other songs included "This is Your Song", a soothing song demonstrating Chou's vocal style, the David Ke-penned "Internal Injury" and Maji Maji which is dedicated to Chou's mother.

Discography

Studio albums

Soundtrack appearances

Filmography

Film

Television series

Variety show

Music video appearances

Tours

NICKTHEREAL Party Tour

Awards and nominations

References

External links

 
 

1988 births
Living people
Taiwanese Mandopop singers
Taiwanese male television actors
Male actors from Taipei
Taiwanese male film actors
21st-century Taiwanese male actors
21st-century Taiwanese male singers
Musicians from Taipei
Taiwanese Christians